Bernhard Goetzke (5 June 1884 – 7 October 1964) was a German stage and film actor. He appeared in 130 films between 1917 and 1961.

Selected filmography

 Fear (1917)
 The Last Sun Son (1919)
 The Japanese Woman (1919)
 The Panther Bride (1919)
 Veritas Vincit (1919)
 The Spies (1919)
 The Dagger of Malaya (1919)
 Anita Jo (1919)
 The Law of the Desert (1920)
 The Eyes as the Accuser (1920)
 Dolls of Death (1920)
 The Skull of Pharaoh's Daughter (1920)
 The Conspiracy in Genoa (1921)
 The Indian Tomb (1921)
 The Secret of Bombay (1921)
 Children of Darkness (1921)
 Murder Without Cause (1921)
 Symphony of Death (1921)
 Island of the Dead (1921)
 The Brothers Karamazov (1921)
 Destiny (1921)
 Dr. Mabuse the Gambler (1922)
 The Marriage of Princess Demidoff (1922)
 Peter the Great (1922)
 Die Nibelungen (1924)
 The Blackguard (1925)
 Curfew (1925)
 Letters Which Never Reached Him (1925)
 Slums of Berlin (1925)
 The Last Days of Pompeii (1926)
 The Mountain Eagle (1926)
 Wrath of the Seas (1926)
 Children of No Importance (1926)
 Two and a Lady (1926)
 The Temple of Shadows (1927)
 The Prisoners of Shanghai (1927)
 Assassination (1927)
 The Schorrsiegel Affair (1928)
 Tragedy at the Royal Circus (1928)
 Guilty (1928)
 Death Drive for the World Record (1929)
 Spring Awakening (1929)
 Dreyfus (1930)
 Alraune (1930)
 Cities and Years (1930)
 Louise, Queen of Prussia (1931)
 1914 (1931)
 The Trunks of Mr. O.F. (1931)
 Checkmate (1931)
 Between Night and Dawn (1931)
 The Mad Bomberg (1932)
 The Black Hussar (1932)
 Rasputin, Demon with Women (1932)
 The Dancer of Sanssouci (1932)
 Secret of the Blue Room (1932)
 Night Convoy (1932)
 The Eleven Schill Officers (1932)
 Typhoon (1933)
 Victoria (1935)
 Escapade (1936)
 The Czar's Courier (1936)
 Michel Strogoff (1936)
 Robert Koch (1939)
 The Fox of Glenarvon (1940)
 The Three Codonas (1940)
 Jud Süß (1940)
 Between Hamburg and Haiti (1940)
 The Swedish Nightingale (1941)
 A Man With Principles? (1943)
 The Golden Spider (1943)

References

External links

1884 births
1964 deaths
20th-century German male actors
German male stage actors
German male film actors
German male silent film actors
Male actors from Gdańsk
People from West Prussia